Pa Na may refer to:

Pa Na language, a Hmongic language of Hunan, China
Pa-na, a village in Burma

See also
Pana (disambiguation)